James Trewynnard (c. 1505 – 1572 or later), of Budock, Cornwall, was an English politician.

He was a Member (MP) of the Parliament of England for Liskeard in 1529, Newport, Cornwall in 1547 and Penryn in November 1554.

References

1505 births
Year of death missing
Members of the Parliament of England (pre-1707) for Liskeard
Members of the Parliament of England for Newport (Cornwall)
Members of the Parliament of England for Penryn
English MPs 1529–1536
English MPs 1547–1552
English MPs 1554–1555